Jaroslav Ježek (9 March 1926 – 1998) was a Czech chess player who held the ICCF title of International Correspondence Chess Grandmaster (1985). He was a European Team Chess Championship team medalist (1957).

Biography
In the 1950s Jaroslav Ježek was one of the leading Czechoslovak chess players. He repeatedly competed in the Czechoslovak Chess Championship finals.

Jaroslav Ježek played for Czechoslovakia in the Chess Olympiad:
 In 1956, at second reserve board in the 12th Chess Olympiad in Moscow (+3, =6, -2).

Jaroslav Ježek played for Czechoslovakia in the European Team Chess Championship:
 In 1957, at tenth board in the 1st European Team Chess Championship in Vienna (+1, =3, -1) and won team bronze medal.

In later years, Ježek actively participated in correspondence chess tournaments. In 1956-1959, he participated in 2nd World Correspondence Chess Championship and ranked in 10th place. In 1985, Jaroslav Ježek was awarded the International Correspondence Chess Grandmaster (GMC) title.

References

External links
 
 
 

1926 births
1998 deaths
Czechoslovak chess players
Czech chess players
Chess Olympiad competitors
Correspondence chess grandmasters
20th-century chess players